The 1938 Penn State Nittany Lions men's soccer team represented Pennsylvania State University during the 1938 season playing in the Intercollegiate Soccer League. It was the program's 28th season fielding a men's varsity soccer team. The 1938 season is William Jeffrey's 13th at the helm.

Background 

The 1938 season was the Nittany Lions' 28th season as a varsity soccer program, and their 12th season playing as a part of the Intercollegiate Soccer Football Association. The team was led by 13th year head coach, William Jeffrey, who had previously served as the head coach for the semi-professional soccer team, Altoona Works.

In their third game of the season the Nittany Lions defeated Western Maryland 12-0, marking the largest win in Penn State soccer history. Penn State was awarded an undisputed national championship title from the Intercollegiate Soccer Football Association after finishing the 1938 season 8–0–0. The team was able to tally 35 goals and hold their opposition to 6 goals. At the end of the 1938 season the team had stretched their undefeated streak to 45 games. Three Nittany Lions were tapped as all-east soccer team selections.

Squad

Departures

Roster

Schedule 

|-
!colspan=8 style=""| Regular season
|-

Honors and awards

References

External links 

1938
Penn State Nittany Lions
Penn State Nittany Lions men's soccer